Kentucky Route 476 (KY 476) is a  state highway in Kentucky that runs from Kentucky Route 15 Business in northern Hazard to Kentucky Route 15 at Lost Creek via Darfork, Dwarf, Hardshell, and Clayhole.

Major intersections

References

0476
Transportation in Perry County, Kentucky
Transportation in Breathitt County, Kentucky